Kayrat Biekenov (born 25 May 1972) is a Kazakhstani former ski jumper. He competed in the normal hill and large hill events at the 1994 Winter Olympics.

References

External links
 

1972 births
Living people
Kazakhstani male ski jumpers
Olympic ski jumpers of Kazakhstan
Ski jumpers at the 1994 Winter Olympics
Place of birth missing (living people)